"Too Bad" is a 2001 song by Nickelback.

Too Bad may also refer to:

 Too Bad (album), by Buju Banton, 2006
 "Too Bad", a song by King Princess from the 2022 album Hold On Baby
 "Too Bad", a song by Lil' Kim from the 2019 album 9
 "Too Bad", a song by Rival Sons from the 2019 album Feral Roots
 "Too Bad", a 2004 song by Steve Took's Horns

See also